The following list enumerate and expand on notable tors.

Tors in Great Britain

Dartmoor

Dartmoor represents one of the largest areas of exposed granite in the United Kingdom, covering an area of 368 square miles (954 square kilometres). It is part of a chain of granite stretching through Cornwall, as far as the Isles of Scilly.

Some of the more durable granite survived to form the rocky crowns of Dartmoor tors. One of the best known is at Haytor, on the eastern part of the moor, whose granite is of unusually fine quality and was quarried from the hillside below the tor during the 19th and early 20th centuries. Its stone was used to construct the pillars outside the British Museum in London, and to build London Bridge. The last granite to be quarried there was used to build Exeter War Memorial in 1919.

Ten Tors is an annual weekend hike on Dartmoor.

Cornwall
Alex Tor, Bodmin Moor
Hawk's Tor, Bodmin Moor. There are two on the moor:
One near Lewannick
One near Temple
Helman Tor, mid–Cornwall
Rough Tor, Bodmin Moor
Trewortha Tor, Bodmin Moor
Showery Tor, Bodmin Moor
Cheesewring, Bodmin Moor
Brown Willy, Bodmin Moor
Carneglos Tor, Bodmin Moor
Temple Tor, Bodmin Moor
Garrow Tor, Bodmin Moor
Kilmar Tor, Bodmin Moor
Butter's Tor, Bodmin Moor
Carn Brea, Redruth
Sharp Tor, Bodmin Moor
St Bellarmins Tor, Bodmin Moor
Codda Tor, Bodmin Moor
Maiden Tor, Bodmin Moor 
Little Rough Tor, Bodmin Moor
Catshole Tor, Bodmin Moor
Butter's Tor, Bodmin Moor
Carbilly Tor, Bodmin Moor 
Fox Tor, Bodmin Moor
Tolcarne Tor, Bodmin Moor
Greymare Rock, Bodmin Moor
Hill Tor, Bodmin Moor 
Tregarrick Tor, Bodmin Moor 
Bearah Tor, Bodmin Moor 
Newel Tor, Bodmin Moor
Colvannick Tor, Bodmin Moor
Carburrow Tor, Bodmin Moor
Carkees Tor, Bodmin Moor
Carey Tor, Bodmin Moor
Trekennick Tor, Bodmin Moor
Lanlavery Rock, Bodmin Moor
Jubilee Rock, Bodmin Moor

Hills:
Kit Hill, Callington
Hensbarrow Beacon, St Austell Downs
Buttern Hill, Bodmin Moor
Candra Hill, Bodmin Moor
Carn Brea, Penwith
Dinnever Hill, Bodmin Moor
Louden Hill, Bodmin Moor
Caradon Hill, Bodmin Moor
Watch Croft, Penwith
Hensbarrow Beacon, St Austell Downs
Carnmenellis, between Redruth, Helston and Penryn
Hobb's Hill, Bodmin Moor

Peak District
There are many tors in this area, notably in the Dark Peak where the host rock is Millstone Grit:

Back Tor, Derwent Edge (538m)
Carl Wark, Hathersage Moor
Chee Tor, Buxton
Dovestone Tor, Derwent Edge (505m)
Great Tor, Bamford

Higger Tor (384m) and Over Owler Tor (375m)
Howshaw Tor overlooking Sheffield
Ladybower Tor, Upper Derwent Valley
Low Tor, Bradfield Moors
The Salt Cellar on Derwent Edge
Mam Tor, Edale
Whinstone Lee Tor
White Tor, Derwent Moors (487m)

In addition there are hills which incorporate 'tor' in their name but yet do not feature the geomorphological feature described in this article. Examples include Mam Tor and Shining Tor.

Pennines
 Almscliffe Crag west of Harrogate
 Cow and Calf, Ilkley Moor in West Yorkshire. Made from Millstone Grit.
 Haslingden Tor. (Musbury Hill) Helmshore Rossendale, Lancashire

Scotland
There are numerous tors developed in the Cairngorm granite in the Scottish Highlands:
 The Barns of Bynack, tors on Bynack More
Ben Avon
Beinn a' Bhuird
Beinn Mheadhoin

Other areas
Glastonbury Tor
Stiperstones, Shropshire Hills
The Schil, Newton Tors in Northumberland

Tor Bay, one of the sandy beaches near Oxwich Bay on the Gower Peninsula in south Wales, is so-called because the beach is framed by a huge outcrop of Carboniferous Limestone.

Tors in other regions

Africa

 Kit-Mikayi, Kenya
 Castle koppies of Central Zimbabwe.

Germany 

Externsteine in the Teutoburg Forest, North Rhine-Westphalia
Greifensteine in the Ore Mountains of Saxony
Großer Waldstein in the Fichtelgebirge mountains of Bavaria
Heinrichshöhe and Hohneklippen in the Harz mountains of central Germany
Wolfenstein in Bavaria

India
Tors are very commonly found in the Telangana and the Rayalaseema regions of Andhra Pradesh

North America

 Stone Mountain, Georgia, USA
 Angel Rocks and Granite Tors, Chena River State Recreation Area, Alaska
 Finger Mountain area, Dalton Highway, Alaska
 Elephant Rocks, Missouri
 Apache Leap Formation near Superior, Arizona
 Texas Canyon, Arizona
 Wichita Mountains, Oklahoma
  Pilot Mountain, North Carolina
 High Tor, Freeland Mountain (a part of Pocono Mountain), near Freeland, Pennsylvania
 Vedauwoo, Wyoming

New Zealand
 Schist tors in Central Otago

Spain
 Tors of the Central Pyrinees.
 Castle koppies of Traba Massif, Galicia.

References

Rock formations of England
Geography-related lists
Weathering landforms